Club Social Deportivo y Cultural Sachapuyos (sometimes referred as Sachapuyos) is a Peruvian football club, playing in the city of Chachapoyas, Amazonas, Peru.

History
The Club Cultural Sachapuyos was founded on September 5, 1952.

In 1999 Copa Perú, the club classified to the Regional Stage, but was eliminated by Deportivo Pomalca in the Group Stage.

In 2000 Copa Perú, the club classified to the Regional Stage, but was eliminated by Deportivo Pomalca in the Group Stage.

In 2002 Copa Perú, the club classified to the Regional Stage, but was eliminated by Flamengo in the Group Stage.

In 2017 Copa Perú, the club classified to the National Stage, but was eliminated when finished in 27th place.

In 2018 Copa Perú, the club classified to the Departamental Stage, but was eliminated by Bagua Grande in the Semifinals.

Honours

Regional
Liga Departamental de Amazonas:
Winners (9): 1977, 1990, 1993, 1995, 1996, 1997, 1999, 2000, 2002
Runner-up (1): 2017

Liga Provincial de Chachapoyas:
Winners (6): 1977, 1990, 2002, 2012, 2018, 2022
Runner-up (2): 2017, 2019

Liga Distrital de Chachapoyas:
Winners (3): 2002, 2017, 2018
Runner-up (3): 2012, 2019, 2022

See also
List of football clubs in Peru
Peruvian football league system

References

External links
 

Football clubs in Peru
Association football clubs established in 1952
1952 establishments in Peru